Jungle Jim is a 1937 Universal serial film based on Jungle Jim, the comic strip by Alex Raymond. Grant Withers starred as Jungle Jim, and Henry Brandon played the villainous Cobra.

Plot
Two safaris enter the African jungle intent on finding a white girl who is the heiress to a fortune. One safari, led by Jungle Jim, wants to make sure she gets the news that she is now a rich woman and escort her back to civilisation. The leaders of the other safari want to kill the girl so they can try to get hold of her inheritance themselves...

Cast
 Grant Withers as Jungle Jim
 Betty Jane Rhodes as Joan
 Raymond Hatton as Malay Mike
 Evelyn Brent as Shanghai Lil 
 Henry Brandon as The Cobra
 Bryant Washburn as Bruce Redmond
 Claude King as Territorial Consul Gilbert [Ch.1]
 Selmer Jackson as Attorney Tyler [Ch.1] (as Selmar Jackson)
 Al Bridge as Slade
  Paul Sutton as LaBat [Chs.1-6]
 Al Duvall as Kolu
 Frank Mayo as Tom Redmond [Ch.1]
 J.P. McGowan as Ship Captain J.S. Robinson [Ch.1]
 Frank McGlynn Jr. as Red Hallihan [Ch.1]

Chapter titles
 Into the Lion's Den
 The Cobra Strikes
 The Menacing Hand
 The Killer's Trail
 The Bridge of Terror
 Drums of Doom
 The Earth Trembles
 The Killer Lion
 The Devil Bird
 Descending Doom
 In the Cobra's Castle
 The Last Safari

See also
 Jungle Jim
 Jungle Jim (film) series
 Jungle Jim (TV series)
 List of film serials by year
 List of film serials by studio
Congo Bill
Bomba the Jungle Boy
Ramar of the Jungle

References

External links

1937 films
1937 adventure films
American black-and-white films
1930s English-language films
Films based on comic strips
Universal Pictures film serials
Films directed by Ford Beebe
Jungle Jim films
American adventure films
1930s American films